The 47th Annual American Music Awards were held on November 24, 2019 at the Microsoft Theater in Los Angeles, recognizing the most popular artists and albums of 2019. It was broadcast live on ABC, and hosted by Ciara. Taylor Swift received the Artist of the Decade award, and was also the most awarded artist of the night with six wins, becoming the most awarded artist in the award's history with 29 wins and extending her record in the categories of Artist of the Year, Favorite Pop/Rock Female Artist and Favorite Pop/Rock Album. Post Malone received the most nominations of any artist with seven nominations, followed by Ariana Grande and first-time nominee Billie Eilish with six nominations each.

Performances
*For the first time in 18 years, Toni Braxton returned to perform, "Un-Break My Heart" to coincide with her 25th Anniversary since she first performed and won.

Presenters

 Carole King — introduced and presented Artist of the Decade to Taylor Swift.
 Paula Abdul — introduced Toni Braxton.
 Carrie Underwood — introduced Christina Aguilera and A Great Big World.
 Tyra Banks – introduced Lizzo.
 Chadwick Boseman – presented Favorite Alternative Rock Artist.
 Kane Brown — introduced Thomas Rhett.
 Misty Copeland and Ben Platt — presented Favorite Country Song.
 Rivers Cuomo and Pete Wentz — introduced Post Malone, Ozzy Osbourne, Watt, and Travis Scott.
 Heidi Klum and Dan Levy — presented Favorite Pop/Rock Album.
 David Dobrik and Maddie Hasson — introduced Kesha and Big Freedia.
 Cobie Smulders and Michael Ealy — presented Favorite Country Album and Favorite Female Country Artist.
 Jamie Lee Curtis and Katherine Langford — presented Collaboration of the Year.
 Dan + Shay and Maya Hawke – presented Favorite Rap/Hip-Hop Album.
 Patrick Schwarzenegger and Jenna Dewan – introduced Halsey.
 Taran Killam and Jameela Jamil – presented New Artist of the Year.
 Jharrel Jerome and Megan Thee Stallion – presented Favorite Rap/Hip-Hop Song.
 Regina King – presented Artist of the Year.
 Billy Porter – introduced Camila Cabello.
 Constance Wu — presented Favorite Pop/Rock Song.
 Tyler, the Creator – introduced Billie Eilish.
 Billie Eilish – introduced Green Day.
 Kelsea Ballerini – introduced Shania.

Winners and nominees

References

2019 awards in the United States
2019 in Los Angeles
2019 music awards
American Music Awards